is a Japanese international school in Tan Phu Ward, Phú Mỹ Hung, District 7, Ho Chi Minh City, Vietnam. It was established in 1997.

See also
 Japanese people in Vietnam
 Japan–Vietnam relations
 Japanese language education in Vietnam

References

Further reading

 Independent articles
 Morishita, Kiyoko (森下 規代子; Osaka University of Comprehensive Children Education). "A report of the research on Vietnam Japanese School" (Archive) (ベトナム日本人学校 調査報告). Journal of Osaka University of Comprehensive Children Education (大阪総合保育大学紀要) (3), 157-168, 2009-03-20. Info at CiNii. - English abstract available on pages 10-12 of 12
 伊藤 健太郎. ホーチミン日本人学校及び日本人の教育環境 (海外便り(Vol.105)). Report 148, 71-73, 2013. 共立総合研究所. Info at CiNii.
 Articles by former staff members
 有城 美晴 (前ホーチミン日本人学校:三重県南牟婁郡紀宝町立相野中学校). "ベトナム,ホーチミンにおける教育事情(平成18年度〜20年度) (第5章 国際理解教育・現地理解教育)." 在外教育施設における指導実践記録 32, 78-81, 2009-10-12. Tokyo Gakugei University. Info at CiNii.

External links
 Japanese School in Ho Chi Minh City 

International schools in Ho Chi Minh City
Japanese international schools in Vietnam
Ho Chi Minh City
1997 establishments in Vietnam
Educational institutions established in 1997